Byron Guthrie (born 28 December 1935) is  a former Australian rules footballer who played with Footscray in the Victorian Football League (VFL).

Notes

External links 
		

Living people
1935 births
Australian rules footballers from Victoria (Australia)
Western Bulldogs players
University Blacks Football Club players